Archives of Environmental Contamination and Toxicology is a quarterly peer-reviewed scientific journal published by Springer Science+Business Media, covering environmental health and the effects of contaminants on the environment. It was established in 1973 and the editor-in-chief is Daniel R. Doerge (National Center for Toxicological Research). According to the Journal Citation Reports, the journal has a 2020 impact factor of 2.804.

References

External links 
 

Springer Science+Business Media academic journals
Toxicology journals
Publications established in 1973
English-language journals
Quarterly journals